The 2009 IIHF World Women's Championships was held in Hämeenlinna, Finland, from April 4 to 12, 2009. This was the 12th women's championship run by the International Ice Hockey Federation (IIHF). The defending champions United States defeated Canada 4–1 in the final match to win the gold medal and retain their top standing another year.

This was the last world championships with nine teams in the Top Division. Two teams—Japan and China—were relegated to Division I, replaced by only one—Slovakia—promoted from there. Division I also relegated two, Czech Republic and France, while receiving only one team through promotion, Latvia, along with the two from the top division. Division II only relegated one team, the Netherlands, but did not receive any promoted teams from the lower divisions. The lower divisions of III, IV, and V, were canceled for the 2009 cycle, with the lowest seeded team in each to be dropped down one division. The final result was that the Top Division will be reduced in size by one team for 2011, while the lowest division (Division V) will increase by one team.

Top Division

Preliminary round

Group A

All times are local (UTC+3).

Group B

All times are local (UTC+3).

Group C

All times are local (UTC+3).

Qualifying round

Group D (1st–3rd place)

All times are local (UTC+3).

 and  advance to the final.  plays in the bronze medal game.

Group E (4th–6th place)

 advances to the bronze medal game.

All times are local (UTC+3).

Consolation round

Group F (7th–9th place)

All times are local (UTC+3).

Final round

Match for third place
All times are local (UTC+3).

Final
All times are local (UTC+3).

Awards and Statistics

Scoring leaders
GP = Games played; G = Goals; A = Assists; Pts = Points; +/− = Plus-minus; PIM = Penalties In Minutes
Source: IIHF.com

Goaltending leaders
(minimum 40% team's total ice time)

TOI = Time on ice (minutes:seconds); GA = Goals against; GAA = Goals against average; Sv% = Save percentage; SO = Shutouts
Source: IIHF.com

Directorate Awards
Goaltender: Charline Labonté, 
Defenseman: Jenni Hiirikoski, 
Forward: Hayley Wickenheiser, 
Source: IIHF.com

Media All-Stars
Goaltender: Jessie Vetter, 
Defensemen: Angela Ruggiero, ; Carla MacLeod, 
Forwards: Julie Chu, ; Michelle Karvinen, ; Natalie Darwitz, 
MVP: Carla MacLeod, 
Source:

Division I
The following teams took part in the Division I tournament which was held in Graz, Austria, from April 4 to April 10, 2009. The winner of the group gets promoted to the Top Division for the 2011 championships, while the two bottom teams in the group are relegated to Division II.

Statistics

Scoring leaders 
GP = Games played; G = Goals; A = Assists; Pts = Points; +/− = Plus-minus; PIM = Penalties In Minutes
Source: IIHF.com

Goaltending leaders 
(minimum 40% team's total ice time)

TOI = Time on ice (minutes:seconds); GA = Goals against; GAA = Goals against average; Sv% = Save percentage; SO = Shutouts
Source: IIHF.com

Directorate Awards
Goaltender: Zuzana Tomčíková, 
Defenseman: Iveta Karafiátová, 
Forward: Maritta Becker, 

Source: IIHF.com

Division II
The following teams took part in the Division II tournament which was held in Torre Pellice, Italy, from April 12 to April 18, 2009. The winner of the group was promoted to Division I for the 2011 championships, while the last-placed team in the group was relegated to Division III.

 was promoted to the Division I for the 2011 Women's World Ice Hockey Championships.  was relegated to Division III.   was to have been relegated but since Division III was not played, no one was promoted to take their place.

Statistics

Scoring leaders 
GP = Games played; G = Goals; A = Assists; Pts = Points; +/− = Plus-minus; PIM = Penalties In Minutes
Source: IIHF.com

Goaltending leaders 
(minimum 40% team's total ice time)

TOI = Time on ice (minutes:seconds); GA = Goals against; GAA = Goals against average; Sv% = Save percentage; SO = Shutouts
Source: IIHF.com

Directorate Awards
Goaltender: Lolita Andrisevska, 
Defenseman: Linda de Rocco, 
Forward: Iveta Koka, 
MVP    : Iveta Koka
Source: IIHF.com

Division III, Division IV and Division V
The Division III, Division IV and Division V did not play this year. The respective tournaments were cancelled. The reasons seem to be multiple. No country wanted to assume the financial costs of the tournaments. The tournaments will be scheduled for 2011. It has the effect the following changes:

Iceland is not promoted to the Division III, but stay in the Division IV.
Turkey is now relegated from Division IV to the new division V.
Division V will then consist of Turkey, and the four new nations who were to play in 2009: Poland, Bulgaria, Spain and Ireland.

References

External links
 IIHF official site
Complete results

IIHF results index for 2009

IIHF Women's World Ice Hockey Championships
World
2009
World
April 2009 sports events in Europe
Sport in Hämeenlinna
Women's ice hockey competitions in Finland
2009 in Finnish women's sport